Christopher Jonathan Ben Ridley (17 June 1946 – 10 September 2009) was a Rhodesian-born South African first-class cricketer.

Life and career 
Ridley was born at Bulawayo in Southern Rhodesia in June 1946. He was educated at Milton High School, before studying in England at Keble College, Oxford. While studying at Oxford he played first-class cricket for Oxford University in 1971, making six appearances. Ridley scored 88 runs in his six matches, with a high score of 23. With his right-arm medium-fast bowling, Ridley took 3 wickets at an expensive average of 118.66 runs apiece per wicket.

Ridley later emigrated to South Africa, where he died at Cape Town in September 2009. His brother, Giles, was a Rhodes Scholar who also played first-class cricket for Oxford University.

References

External links

1946 births
2009 deaths
Sportspeople from Bulawayo
Alumni of Keble College, Oxford
South African cricketers
Oxford University cricketers
Rhodesian emigrants to South Africa